The Quiet Revolution was a period of social and economic change in Quebec in the 1960s.

(The) Quiet Revolution may also refer to:
 The Quiet Revolution (album), a 1993 album by Ronny Jordan
 Quiet Revolution (album), a 1999 album by Chris de Burgh
 Quiet Revolution (company), an American management consulting company

It may also refer to:
 Quietrevolution wind turbine, a brand of vertical axis helical turbine
 The Quiet Revolution, a period beginning in the 1970s when women increasingly entered the workforce